Hope Lodge may refer to:

 Hope Lodge (American Cancer Society), a program of the American Cancer Society providing lodging to cancer patients receiving treatment far from home and their caregivers
Hope Lodge No. 145, Lafayette, Louisiana, listed on the National Register of Historic Places (NRHP)
Hope Lodge (Whitemarsh Township, Pennsylvania), NRHP-listed

See also
Hope House (disambiguation)